ADK Hospital is the first and the largest private tertiary care hospital in the Republic of Maldives. The hospital is one of the two major private hospitals located in  Greater Malé region. The acronym ‘ADK’ is derived from the name late Abdul Rahman Dhon Kaleyfaanu, who is the father of Ahmed Nashid, one of the founding members of ADK Group.

Logo
The logo of ADK Hospital was rebranded in late 2008. The new logo depicts a snake wrapped around a wand representing the rod of Asclepius, which is used as an international medical symbol depicting healing through medicine. The apple denotes health and well-being as well as prevention.

History
The origins of ADK Hospital go back to the small clinic founded in 1987 by Mr. Ahmed Nashid and Late Mr. Hassan Ibrahim under the name of "Mediclinic". This marked the beginning of the ADK Group of companies. The facilities of the clinic were extended and strengthened over the five years that followed to satisfy the need of the clients of the clinics. The service was named ADK Medical Center in 1992. The Group realized its most notable single development in 1996: the establishment of ADK Hospital in Male, the first private hospital in the Maldives, which brought about a monumental shift in the Group's future direction.

Services
ADK Hospital has been awarded the Facilities Improvement Initiative of the Year 2020 - Maldives by the Healthcare Asia Awards. There are over 200 beds in the hospital, with an extra 6 beds in the Intensive Care Unit (ICU), 12 in the High Dependency unit (HDU), 5 in the Cardiac Care Unit (CCU) and 10 in the Neonatal Intensive Care Unit (NICU).

29 specialties and over 90 physicians covering nearly all medical specialties and sub-specialties. There are advanced diagnostics and therapeutics, dental, general and specialty medicine, surgical services, intensive care, and rehabilitation. There are currently 5 operation theatres in the Hospital, including Sunrise, Beach, Underwater, Seed and Nest, the latter two dedicated to obstetrics and gynecological surgeries. It also has biplane Cardiac Catheterization Laboratory providing high-end cardiac and neurological interventions.

Departments
Anesthesiology
Cardiology
Cardiothoracic and Vascular Surgery
Dentistry
Dermatology and Venereology
ENT
Emergency Medicine
Endocrinology
Gastroenterology
Internal Medicine
Laboratory
Neurology
Nephrology
Neurosurgery
Nutrition & Dietetics
Obstetrics & Gynecology
Orthopedics
Ophthalmology
Pediatrics
Physiotherapy & Rehabilitation
Psychiatry
Pulmonary and Respiratory Medicine
Radiology
Reconstructive, Regenerative and Aesthetic Surgery (Plastic Surgery)
Speech Therapy
Surgery
Urology

References

External links
 ADK Hospital

Hospital buildings completed in 1987
Hospitals in the Maldives
Hospitals established in 1987
Malé